Drake Head is a headland forming the west side of the entrance to Davies Bay. It was discovered from the Terra Nova under Lieutenant Harry L.L. Pennell, Royal Navy, in February 1911, and named for Francis R.H. Drake, a meteorologist on board the Terra Nova.

References 

Headlands of Oates Land